Southridge School is a K-12 private school in South Surrey, British Columbia, Canada.  It is a regional school, serving from as far away as Richmond and Ladner, though most students are from the White Rock, South Surrey area.

Facilities
The school has two permanent buildings (Junior School building and Senior School building), two gymnasiums, two libraries, one computer lab, multiple science labs, an auditorium and four athletic fields (including one FieldTurf field).  The construction of Southridge was funded by private donations, largely from parents.  Although construction was initially opposed by abutters, amidst claims of potential property devaluation, it was eventually approved by the town board in 1993.

Academics
Southridge School follows the International Baccalaureate curriculum in the Junior school, through the Primary Years and Middle Years programs. In the Senior school, Southridge follows the typical British Columbian 8-12 curriculum, including: English, Physics, Chemistry and Biology (taught with British Columbia standards), as well as AP courses in these fields as well as in History, Literature and Calculus. The Southridge Senior School uses a unique model of learning called Harkness, which emphasizes discussion based learning and dialogue during class. Southridge was ranked by the Fraser Institute in 2018-19 as #1 out of 252 British Columbian Secondary Schools.

Arts
The School Arts program includes Music, Fine Arts, Media Arts, and Drama.  Achievements by the school include multiple wins and nominations at Zoomfest, a local film competition, as well as multiple Concert Band Festival Awards. The school also hosts an annual Arts Auction.

Sports
Southridge is classified as a 'Single A' sized school.  Southridge has won several Fraser Valley Championships in Basketball, Soccer and Field Hockey.  In 2006, Southridge won the Provincial Championship for Tennis as well as 6th place in Senior Boys and Girls Soccer. The Junior Girls (Grades 8-9) CAIS soccer team also won 1st place in the CAIS tournaments in 2006 and 2008. In 2013, the Senior Boys Soccer team accomplished a 5th-place finish in AA provincials. In 2015, the Senior Boys Soccer team won the Fraser Valley banner followed by a 2nd-place finish at the BC provincials tournament. In 2014 and 2015 respectively, the Senior Boy 'AA' Basketball team won the Fraser Valley Championship. This was followed by a Senior Boy 'AAA' Provincial Championship win in 2016.

Traditions
Annually, in November, a Gala is held to showcase the school, for many of its parents and staff.  The Gala also helps fund requirements for the school, such as new equipment or resources.  As well, an annual Concert and Play are organized by the Arts department.  During the Spring, a golf tournament is held at nearby Hazelmere Golf and Country Club to raise funds in support of organizations. Throughout July, summer camps are offered for youth, in subjects such as robotics and hiking. Until 2006, the Southridge Senior School had "Spirit Week" consisting of five days where the students were to dress up in costumes related to the theme of the day. Southridge also has an annual Country Fair every May, in which sales of second hand items, games, and activities are provided to raise funds for the school.  During the winter, an annual tradition called the Southridge Feast takes place.  The week before winter break starts, Southridge's parent community organizes a turkey dinner for the entire Senior School student body and faculty to enjoy.  After dinner, students and faculty enjoy a night of entertainment put on by students and teachers, which include skits and videos that kindly poke fun at elements of the school, as well as performances and games.

Service
The school is involved with Free the Children and "Leaders Today" in which students in the Senior school have the opportunity to visit developing countries and "make a difference." Service is 'infused into the core' of the schools values and is highly supported and approved. Opportunities to help the school are given, and teachers help younger students create and present fund-raisers to the whole school.  Southridge also partners with Semiahmoo House, a local charity that supports the disabled in the vicinity.  In 2005, TREK (Teens Running for Every Kid) was created; a 5 km run for youth ages 13–19, with 100% of the proceeds donated to service initiatives around the world. In the past, the school has been heavily involved with the Guildford Family Place, and various shelters for women.

Extracurricular activities
 Reach For the Top
 Math Club
 Model UN
 Hub Club
 Environmental Sustainability Club
 Business Case Club
 Culture Club
 Southridge Chronicle (Newspaper Team)
 Service Club
 Arthead
 Media Club
Cross Country Ski Club
Entrepreneurship Club
Computer Programming & App Development Club
Science Olympics Team
Media Club
Ball Hockey Club

Southridge is involved in a variety of service opportunities, including volunteering options with Martha Currie Elementary School, Semiahmoo House Society and God's Little Acre, while in-school opportunities include Peer Tutoring and Math for All.

References

External links
 Southridge School at www.southridge.bc.ca

Private schools in British Columbia
International Baccalaureate schools in British Columbia
Educational institutions established in 1993
High schools in Surrey, British Columbia
Elementary schools in Surrey, British Columbia
1993 establishments in British Columbia